The 1924 Idaho gubernatorial election was held on November 4, 1924. Incumbent Republican Charles C. Moore defeated Progressive nominee H. F. Samuels with 43.94% of the vote.

General election

Candidates
Major party candidates
Charles C. Moore, Republican 
A. L. Freehafer, Democratic

Other candidates
H. F. Samuels, Progressive
Dennis J. O'Mahoney, Socialist

Results

References

1924
Idaho
Gubernatorial